"You're My Man" is a song written by Glenn Sutton.  The song was a popular No. 1 country hit by country artist Lynn Anderson from 1971.

Background
"You're My Man" is mainly about the narrator describing her affection for her lover, saying there is no one else in the world for her, and she wants "the whole world to know". The song's orchestral arrangements and pop-influenced sound made it a Countrypolitan recording.

Chart performance
This song was immediately released after Anderson's song "(I Never Promised You a) Rose Garden" became a major country and pop hit in February 1971.  The song was very successful, reaching the top of the country charts in June 1971, and was Anderson's second No. 1 country hit, spending one week at the top of the chart. "You're My Man" was one of 11 singles Anderson would place at the No. 1 position.  The song also reached No. 1 on the Cashbox Country Charts.  "You're My Man" was a major Adult Contemporary hit, placing at No. 6.

Cover versions
Ashley Potter covered it and reached No. 43 in the UK Indie Charts.

References

Songs written by Glenn Sutton
Lynn Anderson songs
1971 songs
Columbia Records singles
Song recordings produced by Glenn Sutton